LTA may refer to

Business Administration Union, a trade union in Finland
Land Transport Authority, a statutory board under the Ministry of Transport of the Singapore Government in Singapore
Lawn Tennis Association in the United Kingdom
Learning Through Art, an educational program of the Guggenheim Museum in New York
Lieutenant in Singapore Civil Defence
Lighter than air, sometimes used in ballooning as in an "LTA pilot license"
Lipoteichoic acid
Lymphotoxin alpha
Lambda Theta Alpha, Latin Sorority, Incorporated
Línea Turística Aereotuy, a Venezuelan airline
Legs, Trunk, Arms, now PR3, an adaptive rowing classification
Long-term average, a type of moving average
Light transmission aggregometry, a method for measuring the aggregation of platelets in blood
Long Term Agreement, a.k.a. Frame contract Framework agreement
Louis Troy Austin